Leibler may refer to:

People
 Richard Leibler (born 1914), American mathematician
 Ludwik Leibler (born 1951), French physicist
 Isi Leibler (1934–2021), Belgian-born Australian-Israeli international Jewish leader
 Stanislas Leibler (born 1959), French-American physicist

Other
 Kullback–Leibler divergence, a measure of information in probability theory
 Leibler Yavneh College, a Jewish day school in Melbourne, Australia

See also
 Liebler, a surname